The following list includes notable people who were born or have lived in  Burlington, Vermont.

Academics and educators

 Davis Rich Dewey, economist and statistician
 Henry Farnham Perkins, zoologist, professor and eugenicist
 Jacqueline Noonan, cardiologist and professor
 John Dewey, philosopher, psychologist and educational reformer
 Murray Bookchin, ecologist and anarchist/Communalist philosopher
 Ralph Abraham, mathematician
 Timothy Steele, poet and academic

Actors and theater figures

 Alessandro Nivola, actor & producer
 Ben Bagley, musical theater producer and innovator
 Field Cate, actor, musician
 Kevin McKenzie, artistic director, American Ballet Theater
 Luis Guzmán, actor
 Orson Bean, film, television and stage actor
 Will Lyman, actor

Artists and illustrators

 Alison Bechdel, cartoonist known for comic strip Dykes to Watch Out For
 James Kochalka, cartoonist, singer/songwriter
 Joseph Mozier, sculptor
 Marc Awodey, artist and writer
 Shane Lavalette, photographer, publisher and editor of Lavalette, director of Light Work
Truman Seymour, watercolorist, military figure

Athletes and athletics personnel

 Billy Kidd, world champion and Olympic skier
 Birdie Tebbetts, Major League Baseball player and manager
 Doc Hazelton, professional baseball player and college coach
 Harry Blanchard, Formula One driver, raced for Porsche team
 Jeanne Ashworth, skater
 Jeremy Kimball, Mixed Martial Artist
 Jimmy Cochran, former Olympic and World Cup alpine ski racer and member of the Skiing Cochrans
 Joe Kirkwood Sr., golfer
 Kelly Clark, snowboarder
 Len Whitehouse, baseball player and assistant coach of Burlington High School's varsity baseball team
 LJ Strenio, Professional freestyle skier
 Patrick Sharp, National Hockey League player, attended University of Vermont
 Paul Hackett, football coach
 Robby Kelley, World Cup alpine ski racer and member of the Skiing Cochrans
 Ross Miner (born 1991), skating coach and retired competitive figure skater
 Ross Powers, snowboarder, Olympic gold medalist
 Ryan Cochran-Siegle, Olympic and World Cup Alpine ski racer and member of the Skiing Cochrans
 Tim Kelley, former World Cup alpine ski racer and member of the Skiing Cochrans

Business figures

 Ben Cohen, co-founder of Ben & Jerry's
 Greg Noonan, early American brew master
 Gustavus Blin Wright, roadbuilder and entrepreneur
 Jerry Greenfield, co-founder of Ben & Jerry's
 William Hepburn Russell, founder of Pony Express

Lawyers and jurists

 Albert Wheeler Coffrin, judge
 George Gale, judge
 Jerome O'Neill, U.S. Attorney for Vermont
 John A. Lovely, Minnesota Supreme Court justice
 John C. Thompson, Justice of the Vermont Supreme Court
 Joseph A. McNamara, U.S. Attorney for Vermont
 Seneca Haselton, Associate Justice of the Vermont Supreme Court, mayor of Burlington, U.S. Minister to Venezuela
 Sherman R. Moulton, Chief Justice of the Vermont Supreme Court

Military figures

 Charles Doolittle, brevet Major General and regimental commander in the Union Army during the American Civil War
 Francis William Billado, United States Army Major General and Adjutant General of the Vermont National Guard
 George Dewey, Admiral; hero of the Manilla Bay Campaign of the Spanish American War
 Henry T. Mayo, United States Navy Admiral, Atlantic Fleet commander in World War I
 Oliver O. Howard, Major General, Civil War veteran, United States Military Academy Commandant, Medal of Honor recipient
 Reginald M. Cram, United States Air Force Major General and Adjutant General of the Vermont National Guard
 Theodore S. Peck, Civil War recipient of the Medal of Honor and Adjutant General of the Vermont National Guard
 Truman Seymour, Mexican–American War and Civil War veteran who attained the rank of Major General
 William Wells, Civil War recipient of the Medal of Honor and Adjutant General of the Vermont National Guard

Musicians

 Eugene Hütz, actor and lead singer of Gogol Bordello
 Members of the rock band Phish:
 Jon Fishman, drummer
 Mike Gordon, bassist
 Page McConnell, keyboardist
 Trey Anastasio, guitarist
 Morgan Page, electronic dance music artist
 Morton Estrin, pianist
 Nothing, Nowhere, musician 
 Peter Pisarczyk, musician
 Tristan Honsinger, musician

Politicians

 Aaron H. Grout, son of Governor Josiah Grout and Vermont Secretary of State
 Albert S. Drew, mayor of Burlington
 Bernie Sanders, former Mayor of Burlington (1981–1989), U.S. Senator from Vermont since 2007, and 2016  and 2020 Democratic presidential candidate
 Bob Kiss, mayor
 Calvin H. Blodgett, mayor of Burlington
 Charles Plympton Smith, banker and politician
 Cornelius P. Van Ness, 10th governor of Vermont
 David J. Foster, congressman
 Donly C. Hawley, mayor of Burlington, Vermont
 Doug Racine, member of the Vermont Senate and lieutenant governor
 Earle B. McLaughlin, U.S. Marshal for Vermont
 Ebenezer Allen, soldier, pioneer, and member of the Vermont General Assembly
 Elliot M. Sutton, mayor of Burlington
 Frank H. Davis, Vermont State Treasurer
 George H. Morse, mayor of Burlington
 Grace Coolidge, first lady, wife of Calvin Coolidge
 Hamilton S. Peck, mayor of Burlington, state legislator, city court judge
 Harold J. Arthur, 68th governor of Vermont
 Heman Lowry, U.S. Marshal for Vermont
 Henry Hitchcock, first attorney general of Alabama
 Howard Dean, former chairman of the Democratic Party, former presidential candidate in 2004, and 79th governor of Vermont
 Isaac R. Harrington, mayor of Buffalo, New York
 Jake Sullivan, U.S. National Security Advisor
 James P. Leddy, politician
 Jason Lorber, politician
 Jason Niles, congressman
 Johannah Leddy Donovan, Vermont state representative
 John J. Burns, mayor of Burlington
 Joseph D. Hatch, Vermont state legislator and mayor of Burlington, Vermont
 Judith Steinberg Dean, physician and First Lady of Vermont
 Louis F. Dow, mayor of Burlington from 1935 to 1939
 Luther C. Dodge, mayor of Burlington
 Madeleine M. Kunin, diplomat and 77th governor of Vermont
 Martin Joseph Wade, congressman and judge
 Patrick Leahy, Vermont’s senior US Senator
 Peter Clavelle, mayor of Burlington
 Philip H. Hoff, 73rd governor of Vermont
 Robert Roberts, mayor of Burlington
 Rufus E. Brown, Vermont Attorney General, member of Vermont State Senate
 Thomas W. Sorrell, U.S. Marshal for Vermont
 Urban A. Woodbury, businessman and 45th governor of Vermont
 Vernon A. Bullard, United States Attorney for the District of Vermont
 Walter J. Bigelow, mayor of Burlington
 Warren Austin, senator from Vermont and ambassador to the United Nations
 William A. Crombie, mayor of Burlington, Vermont
 William Sorrell, attorney general of Vermont

Writers

 Dan Chiasson, poet
 Jack Du Brul, author
 John C. Farrar, editor, writer and publisher
 Theodora Agnes Peck, novelist and poet
 Suzi Wizowaty, author and politician

Others
 Ted Bundy, serial killer, born at the Elizabeth Lund Home for Unwed Mothers
 Truman C. Everts, Washburn-Langford-Doane Expedition
 Horatio Nelson Jackson, first person to drive an automobile across U.S.
 Brianna Maitland, missing girl

References

Burlington
Burlington